Carstairs is a village near Lanark, Scotland.

Carstairs may also refer to:

Carstairs, Alberta, Canada
Carstairs/Bishell's Airport
Carstairs, Queensland, Australia 
Carstairs railway station in Scotland, UK
Carstairs Junction, a village by Carstairs station
 HMS Carstairs (1919), a World War I Royal Navy Hunt minesweeper
Carstairs (surname)
Carstairs Douglas (1830–1877), Scottish missionary
 The Carstairs, American music group
 The Carstairs index of deprivation